Jens Harzer (born 14 March 1972) is a German stage, film, and television actor. He began his career at the Munich Kammerspiele, and has been a member of the Thalia Theatre in Hamburg since 2009. He has appeared at the Salzburg Festival regularly since 2000. Harzer received prizes for roles on stage, in film and on television. He has been the bearer of the Iffland-Ring since March 2019.

Career
Born in Wiesbaden, he was trained as an actor at the Otto Falckenberg School of the Performing Arts in Munich. From 1993 to 2009 he was a member of the ensemble of Dieter Dorn, first at the Munich Kammerspiele and then at the Bayerisches Staatsschauspiel. Harzer has been a member of the Thalia Theatre in Hamburg since 2009.

Since 2000, Harzer has been a regular guest at the Salzburg Festival. Again in a production staged by Stückl, he played the role of Death in Hofmannsthal's Jedermann. In 2008 there, Harzer played the leading role in a staged version of Dostoevsky's Verbrechen und Strafe, staged by Andrea Breth. In 2011, he played the role of Ich in the world premiere of Peter Handke's Immer noch Sturm at the Festival.

Harzer has appeared in 15 films since 1995. At the 56th Berlin International Film Festival in 2006, he performed in two films, Requiem by Hans-Christian Schmid and, in the title role, the drama Der Lebensversicherer by Bülent Akıncı. He won the Silver George for Best Actor at the 28th Moscow International Film Festival for the latter film.

Harzer was named by Bruno Ganz to be his successor as bearer of the Republic of Austria's Iffland-Ring, traditionally bestowed upon the "most significant and most worthy actor of the German-speaking theatre" in the opinion of the previous bearer. Harzer was awarded the ring in a ceremony at the Burgtheater in June 2019, four months after Ganz's death.

Awards
Harzer has received several awards, including:
 1996: Bayerischer Kunstförderpreis in the category Performing Art
 1996: Berliner Kunstpreis of the Akademie der Künste (Förderpreis)
 2003:  for excellent acting, by the association Verein der Freunde des Bayrischen Staatsschauspiels
 2006: Silver George of the Moscow International Film Festival as Best actor for Der Lebensversicherer
 2008: , critics' selection by Theater heute, for Onkel Wanja
 2011: Actor of the year, for Don Carlos
 2015:  for the role Friedrich Wetter Graf vom Strahl in Das Käthchen von Heilbronn at the Thalia Theater
 2017:  for Tatort Amour Fou
 2019: Iffland-Ring

Memberships
 2005 Member of the Bayerische Akademie der Schönen Künste
 2012 Member of the Freie Akademie der Künste Hamburg
 2013 Member of the Akademie der Künste Berlin

Filmography
Films with Harzer have included:
 Hades (1995)
 Der Lebensversicherer (2006)
 Requiem (2006)
 Same Same But Different (2009)
 Boy 7 (2015)
 The Beautiful Days of Aranjuez (2016)
 Long Live Death (Tatort: Es lebe der Tod)  (2016)
 Babylon Berlin (2017)

References

External links

 
 

1972 births
Living people
German male film actors
20th-century German male actors
21st-century German male actors
People from Wiesbaden
Members of the Academy of Arts, Berlin
Iffland-Ring